The Cessna C-106 Loadmaster (or Cessna P260) was a 1940s American twin-engined transport monoplane. Built of plywood it did not enter production due to a wartime shortage of material.

Development
The C-106 Loadmaster was a twin-engined high-wing cantilever monoplane with a retractable tailwheel landing gear. It was powered by two 600 hp Pratt & Whitney R-1340 engines. Two company owned P260 demonstrators were built and given the military designation C-106 Loadmaster. An order for 500 was cancelled due to a shortage of plywood.

Variants
C-106
Military designation for company owned P260 prototype with two R-1340-S3H1 engines.
C-106A
Military designation for company owned P260 prototype with two R-1340-AN-2 engines.

Specifications

See also

References

Notes

Bibliography

C-106
1940s United States military utility aircraft
High-wing aircraft
Aircraft first flown in 1943
Retractable conventional landing gear
Twin piston-engined tractor aircraft